Vanessa Hua is a journalist and writer based in San Francisco. She is the author of Deceit and Other Possibilities (Willow Books, 2016; Counterpoint Press, 2020)  and A River of Stars (Ballantine)  and the novel, Forbidden City (Penguin Random House, 2022). She is a columnist for the San Francisco Chronicle  and a member of the San Francisco Writers' Grotto. Her fiction has appeared in The Atlantic, ZYZZYVA,  Guernica, and other publications. She received a National Endowment for the Arts awards Literature Fellowship award in 2020.

Awards and critical acclaim  
 2020 National Endowment for the Arts fellowship
 2017 Dr. Suzanne Ahn Award for Civil Rights and Social Justice Reporting 
 2017 Finalist, California Book Award 
 2016-17 Asian/Pacific American Award for Literature 
 2015 Rona Jaffe Writers' Award  
 Steinbeck Fellowship in Creative Writing  
 San Francisco Foundation's James D. Phelan Award for fiction

Bibliography 

Deceit and Other Possibilities (Willow Publishing  2016)  
A River of Stars (Ballantine Books August 2018) , a novel about San Francisco Chinatown

References

External links 

American women journalists
American women novelists
21st-century American novelists
21st-century American women writers
Living people
Year of birth missing (living people)
Stanford University alumni
Writers from the San Francisco Bay Area
21st-century American non-fiction writers
American writers of Taiwanese descent